Geographe Bay is in the south-west of Western Australia around 220 km southwest of Perth.

The bay was named in May 1801 by French explorer Nicolas Baudin, after his ship, Géographe. The bay is a wide curve of coastline extending from Cape Naturaliste past the towns of Dunsborough and Busselton, ending near the city of Bunbury. The bay is protected from the rough seas of the Indian Ocean by Cape Naturaliste (named after Naturaliste), which makes it a popular destination for recreational boaters. The bay is extremely shallow, limiting the entrance of large ships. To alleviate this problem the two-kilometre-long Busselton Jetty, the longest in the southern hemisphere, was built.

The Royal Australian Navy frigate  was sunk in the bay off the town of Dunsborough on 14 December 1997, for use as a dive wreck.

The bay attracts whale watchers, who see it as an alternative to Flinders Bay.

The north west part of the bay is the location of a number of surf breaks.

The environment of the drainage systems into the bay, and the bay itself have attracted research and studies.

Notes

Further reading
 Edward Duyker François Péron: An Impetuous Life: Naturalist and Voyager, Miegunyah/MUP, Melb., 2006,
 Fornasiero, Jean; Monteath, Peter and West-Sooby, John.  Encountering Terra Australis: the Australian voyages of Nicholas Baudin and Matthew Flinders, Kent Town, South Australia, Wakefield Press, 2004. 
 Frank Horner, The French Reconnaissance: Baudin in Australia 1801–1803, Melbourne University Press, Melbourne, 1987 .
 Marchant, Leslie R. French Napoleonic Placenames of the South West Coast, Greenwood, WA. R.I.C. Publications, 2004.

External links

Bays of Western Australia
Capes region of South West Western Australia